is a retired professional tennis player from Japan.

Iwabuchi won one ATP Tour doubles title in his career, the 2005 Japan Open, where he and Takao Suzuki defeated Simon Aspelin and Todd Perry in straight sets 5–4(3), 5–4(13).

As of May 17, 2009, Iwabuchi's highest singles ranking was world number 223, which he reached on October 20, 2003.

ATP career finals

Doubles: 1 (1 title)

ATP Challenger and ITF Futures finals

Singles: 28 (11–7)

Doubles: 31 (14–17)

Performance timeline

Singles

External links 
 
 
 
 
 

1975 births
Living people
Japanese male tennis players
Olympic tennis players of Japan
Tennis players at the 1996 Summer Olympics
Tennis players at the 2000 Summer Olympics
Asian Games gold medalists for Japan
Asian Games silver medalists for Japan
Asian Games bronze medalists for Japan
Asian Games medalists in tennis
Medalists at the 1994 Asian Games
Medalists at the 1998 Asian Games
Medalists at the 2006 Asian Games
Tennis players at the 1994 Asian Games
Tennis players at the 1998 Asian Games
Tennis players at the 2006 Asian Games
Sportspeople from Kanagawa Prefecture
20th-century Japanese people